Dr A.N. Upadhye (6 February 1906 – 10 August 1975) was a scholar of Prakrit, Jainalogy and dedicated himself to Jaina studies and wrote many books on Jainalogy. He got recognition and was appreciated in India as well as in Abroad.  He was the President of 46th Kannada Sahitya Sammelana which was held at Shravanabelagola in 1967.

Early life

He was born in the family of Jaina Priests (Upadhyaya) on 2 June 1906 in Sadalga in Chikkodi Taluka of Belgaum District. His primary education in Kannada was provided by  his parents.

Education
Dr Adinath Neminath Upadhye completed his primary education in Sadalaga and Secondary Education at Gilginchi Artal High School, Belgaum. He then went on to receive his Bachelor of Arts with Honours from Bombay University in Sanskrit and Prakrit languages. Later, he moved to Pune for Post-Graduation and joined Bhandarkar Oriental Research Institute. In 1930, he completed a Master of Arts from the same university in Sanskrit and Prakrit languages.

Career
Dr. A.N. Upadhye began his career as a Lecturer of Prakrit at Rajaram College, Kolhapur in 1930. He served full 32 years in Rajaram College and received D.Litt. Degree from Bombay University in 1939. He dedicated himself as Springer Research Scholar of Bombay University from 1939 to 1942. He retired from Rajaram College in 1962 after 32 years of loyal service. Later, he joined Shivaji University as a Professor Emeritus from 1962 to 1971, during this period he served as Dean of Arts Department as well. He worked closely with Dr. A.G. Pawar, then Vice-Chancellor of Shivaji University and also worked hard to lay a strong foundation for newly formed University.

Final Years and Death
In 1971, Upadhye became a founding professor and Head of the Jaina Chair at the University of Mysore.  In this role, he was the driving force behind the establishment of the University's post-graduate Department of Jainalogy and Prankrit.

Within days of retiring from Mysore University, Upadhye died of a heart attack on 10 August 1975 at his home in Kolhapur.

References

External links
 Dr. A.N. Upadhye - His Life And Accomplishments
 

1906 births
1975 deaths
People from Belagavi district
Scholars from Karnataka
Shivaji University
Indian Sanskrit scholars
20th-century Indian Jain writers
Writers from Karnataka